Peary Nunatak or Peary's Nunatak is a nunatak in King Christian IX Land, Sermersooq Municipality, Greenland.

Geography

See also
List of nunataks of Greenland

References

Peary
Peary